DuPont analysis (also known as the DuPont identity, DuPont equation, DuPont framework, DuPont model or the DuPont method) is an expression which breaks ROE (return on equity) into three parts.

The name comes from the DuPont company that began using this formula in the 1920s. DuPont explosives salesman Donaldson Brown invented the formula in an internal efficiency report in 1912.

Basic formula
 Profitability: measured by profit margin
 Asset efficiency: measured by asset turnover
 Financial leverage: measured by equity multiplier

Or 

Or

ROE analysis
The DuPont analysis breaks down ROE (that is, the returns that investors receive from a single dollar of equity) into three distinct elements. This analysis enables the analyst to understand the source of superior (or inferior) return by comparison with companies in similar industries (or between industries).

The DuPont analysis is less useful for industries such as investment banking, in which the underlying elements are not meaningful. Variations of the DuPont analysis have been developed for industries where the elements are weakly meaningful.

Examples

High margin industries
Some industries, such as fashion, may derive a substantial portion of their competitive advantage from selling at a higher margin, rather than higher sales. For high-end fashion brands, increasing sales without sacrificing margin may be critical. The DuPont analysis allows analysts to determine which of the elements is dominant in any change of ROE.

High turnover industries
Certain types of retail operations, particularly stores, may have very low profit margins on sales, and relatively moderate leverage. In contrast, though, groceries may have very high turnover, selling a significant multiple of their assets per year. The ROE of such firms may be particularly dependent on performance of this metric, and hence asset turnover may be studied extremely carefully for signs of under-, or, over-performance. For example, same-store sales of many retailers is considered important as an indication that the firm is deriving greater profits from existing stores (rather than showing improved performance by continually opening stores).

High leverage industries
Some sectors, such as the financial sector, rely on high leverage to generate acceptable ROE. Other industries would see high levels of leverage as unacceptably risky. DuPont analysis enables third parties that rely primarily on their financial statements to compare leverage among similar companies.

ROA and ROE ratio
The return on assets (ROA) ratio developed by DuPont for its own use is now used by many firms to evaluate how effectively assets are used. It measures the combined effects of profit margins and asset turnover.

The return on equity (ROE) ratio is a measure of the rate of return to stockholders. Decomposing the ROE into various factors influencing company performance is often called the DuPont system.

Where
 Net Income = net income after taxes
 Equity = shareholders' equity
 EBIT = Earnings before interest and taxes
 Pretax Income is often reported as Earnings Before Taxes or EBT
This decomposition presents various ratios used in fundamental analysis. 
 The company's tax burden is (Net income ÷ Pretax profit). This is the proportion of the company's profits retained after paying income taxes. [NI/EBT]
 The company's interest burden is (Pretax income ÷ EBIT). This will be 1.00 for a firm with no debt or financial leverage. [EBT/EBIT]
 The company's operating income margin or return on sales (ROS) is (EBIT ÷ Revenue). This is the operating income per dollar of sales. [EBIT/Revenue]
 The company's asset turnover (ATO) is (Revenue ÷ Average Total Assets). 
 The company's equity multiplier is (Average Total Assets ÷ Average Total Equity). This is a measure of financial leverage.

References

External links
 Free Video Tutorial on DuPont Analysis
 Decoding DuPont Analysis
 DuPont analysis

Financial ratios
DuPont